Real Prison Breaks is a British television series shown on ITV4 and Pick TV in 2010 and 2011, which documents prison escapes from around the world. In each episode three prison escapes are documented and reconstructed, usually one from the United States, United Kingdom, Australia or Ireland. It is narrated by Sean Bean.

Episodes

Season 1
 Court House Killer (July 13, 2010)
 Prisoner in Paradise (July 13, 2010)
 Honeymoon's Over (July 20, 2010)
 Nothing to Lose (July 20, 2010)
 Postage Freedom (July 27, 2010) 
 Oral High Jinks (July 27, 2010)
 Everything's Bigger in Texas (August 3, 2010) 
 Casanova's Leap (August 3, 2010
 Digging Out (August 10, 2010)
 Tragic Consequence (August 10, 2010)

Season 2
 The Pact (August 9, 2011)
 The Poster Caper (August 9, 2011)
 Runaway Chuck (August 16, 2011)
 Love on the Run (August 16, 2011)
 Lovelorn & Airborne (August 23, 2011)
 The Torturer (August 23, 2011)
 The Escapist (August 30, 2011)
 A Fugitive Among Us (September 6, 2011)
 Trooper Tragedy (September 13, 2011)
 Gone to the Dogs (September 20, 2011)
 Love Behind Bars (September 27, 2011)
 Love & Loyalty (October 4, 2011)

References

External links
 

2010 British television series debuts
2011 British television series endings
2010s British crime television series
British prison television series
ITV documentaries
English-language television shows